Benjamin van Leer (born 9 April 1992) is a Dutch professional footballer who plays as a goalkeeper. He formerly played for Jong PSV, Roda JC Kerkrade, Ajax and Sparta Rotterdam.

Career
In June 2017, van Leer joined Ajax on a four-year contract from Roda JC Kerkrade. The transfer fee paid to Kerkrade was reported as €700,000.

On 30 June 2020, van Leer signed a two-year contract with Sparta Rotterdam.

Personal life
Born in Nieuwegein, Netherlands, Van Leer is of Moluccan descent. As of 2018, he is in a relationship with Lieke Martens.

Career statistics

Honours
Jong Ajax
 Eerste Divisie: 2017–18

Ajax
 Johan Cruyff Shield: 2019

References

External links
 
 Voetbal International profile 

1992 births
Living people
People from Houten
Dutch people of Indonesian descent
Dutch people of Moluccan descent
Association football goalkeepers
Dutch footballers
Eredivisie players
Eerste Divisie players
PSV Eindhoven players
Jong PSV players
Roda JC Kerkrade players
AFC Ajax players
Jong Ajax players
NAC Breda players
Sparta Rotterdam players
Footballers from Utrecht (province)